Mor Chrysostomos Markose  is a Syriac Orthodox arch bishop. He is the Bishop of E.A.E. Archdiocese of the Syriac Orthodox church in India .

Early years
Jacob Markose was born to P. V, Jacob and Annakkutty of Pallathu House, Thattekkad, Angamali Diocese on 26 September 1966. In 1995, at the age of 29, he was ordained deacon and Kassisho on 9 January 1997 by Mor Polycarpose Geevarghese Metropolitan.
In 1993 he took the initiative to organize Samajam Gospel Team and in 1994 he established Missionary training college and also became the secretary of the Mission society. In 1999 he was appointed as the Manager of the Samajam Publications and in 2000 he became the secretary of the E.A.E.In 2001 he was elected as the general secretary of the E.A.E and as the Manager of the St. Thomas Orphanage and the Santhome Public School at Perumbavoor.
He has master's degree in Sociology and studied Theology and received a diploma in it.

References

Syriac Orthodox Church bishops
Indian Oriental Orthodox Christians
People from Ernakulam district
1966 births
Living people